Heads Up is a 1930 American Pre-Code comedy film directed by Victor Schertzinger and written by Lorenz Hart, Rick Kirkland, John McGowan, Richard Rodgers, Paul Gerard Smith and Louis Stevens. The film stars Charles "Buddy" Rogers, Helen Kane, Victor Moore, Helen Carrington, and Harry Shannon. The film was released on October 11, 1930, by Paramount Pictures.

Cast
Charles "Buddy" Rogers as Jack Mason
Helen Kane as Betty Trumbul
Victor Moore as Skippy Dugan
Helen Carrington as Mrs. Martha Trumbull
Margaret Breen as Mary Trunbull
Gene Gowing as Rex Cutting
Harry Shannon as Capt. Denny

References

External links
 

1930 films
1930 comedy films
American black-and-white films
Silent American comedy films
1930s English-language films
Films about the United States Coast Guard
Films directed by Victor Schertzinger
Paramount Pictures films
1930s American films